Red and White Fleet is a sightseeing and charter tour company operating in the San Francisco Bay Area of California since at least 1892.

Based in the US, the site and the audio on the cruise are, as of 2016, available in 16 languages.

History
The company offers scenic tours of San Francisco Bay and is located at Pier 43 1/2  in Fisherman's Wharf. Red and White Fleet also offers land-based tour packages in concert with other suppliers and offers a number of charter packages for corporate events, as well. The company is family owned to this day, and dates back to 1892, when Thomas C Crowley launched a ferry and tugboat business. In the late 1930s, the company — with the building of San Francisco's two bridges — moved into the sightseeing business, offering visitors an opportunity to cruise under the Golden Gate and Bay Bridges. In 1997, Tom Escher purchased the Red and White Fleet from Crowley Maritime.

The fleet provided commuter ferry operations from 1999 to 2000 from the Richmond Ferry Terminal to San Francisco.

In September 2018 the company launched service of a plug-in hybrid ferry, the first built in the United States furthermore in 2020 they are expected to begin operating their first hydrogen fuel cell powered vessel.

External links

References

Ferry companies of California
Public transportation in San Francisco